This is a complete list of ice hockey players who were drafted in the National Hockey League Entry Draft by the Toronto Maple Leafs franchise. It includes every player who was drafted, regardless of whether they played for the team.

The NHL Entry Draft is held each June, allowing teams to select players who have turned 18 years old by September 15 in the year the draft is held.  The draft order is determined by the previous season's order of finish, with non-playoff teams drafting first, followed by the teams that made the playoffs, with the specific order determined by the number of points earned by each team. The NHL holds a weighted lottery for the 14 non-playoff teams, allowing the winner to move up a maximum of four positions in the entry draft. The team with the fewest points has the best chance of winning the lottery, with each successive team given a lower chance of moving up in the draft. Since 2016, the first three selections have been allocated by the lottery.

Toronto has participated in every NHL draft, with the franchise's first draft pick being Walt McKechnie, taken 6th overall in the 1963 NHL Amateur Draft.  Toronto has selected first overall twice, in 1985 and 2016. Throughout their history, the Maple Leafs have drafted multiple All-Stars and many players who have gone on to have successful careers, including two inducted into the Hockey Hall of Fame: Darryl Sittler and Lanny McDonald.

Key
 Played at least one game with the Maple Leafs
 Spent entire NHL career with the Maple Leafs

Draft picks
Statistics are complete as of the 2021–22 NHL season and show each player's career regular season totals in the NHL.  Wins, losses, ties, overtime losses and goals against average apply to goaltenders and are used only for players at that position.

See also
List of Toronto Maple Leafs players

References
General
 
 
 
Specific

Draft
 
Toronto Maple Leafs